Nicholas Percy (born 5 December 1994) is a Scottish athlete specialising in the discus throw. He represented Great Britain at the 2017 World Championships without reaching the final. He won a silver medal at the 2013 European Junior Championships.

His personal best in the event is 65.00 metres set in Manchester in 2022.

He became British champion for the fourth time when winning the discus throw event at the 2020 British Athletics Championships with a throw of 59.74.

International competitions

References

1994 births
Living people
Sportspeople from Glasgow
Scottish male discus throwers
British male discus throwers
World Athletics Championships athletes for Great Britain
Commonwealth Games competitors for Scotland
Athletes (track and field) at the 2014 Commonwealth Games
Competitors at the 2019 Summer Universiade
British Athletics Championships winners
Nebraska Cornhuskers men's track and field athletes